Malcolm Jeffrey Scott (11 April 1958 – 4 November 2017) was an Australian rules footballer who played with St Kilda and Sydney in the Victorian Football League (VFL).

Scott’s Ballarat Football League achievements included more than 100 junior and more than 100 senior games with North Ballarat FC and three senior premierships in 1978, 1979 and 1982. He also played more than 50 senior games with Sebastopol FC and more than 100 senior games with Bacchus Marsh FC. Scott was the Tony Lockett Medalist for most goals kicked in a BFL season in 1987 and 1990.

Malcolm Scott also played for Learmonth in the Central Highlands FL and Avoca in the Lexton FL.

Malcolm Scott was also a long serving member of the Australian Federal Police and Victoria Police. He committed suicide in November 2017, aged 59.

Notes

External links 

		
1958 births
2017 deaths
2017 suicides
Australian rules footballers from Victoria (Australia)		
St Kilda Football Club players		
Sydney Swans players
North Ballarat Football Club players
Suicides in Victoria (Australia)